The 2020 United States presidential election in Maine was held on Tuesday, November 3, 2020, as part of the 2020 United States presidential election in which all 50 states plus the District of Columbia participated. Maine voters chose electors to represent them in the Electoral College via a popular vote, pitting the Republican Party's nominee, incumbent President Donald Trump, and running mate Vice President Mike Pence against Democratic Party nominee, former Vice President Joe Biden, and his running mate California Senator Kamala Harris. Maine has four electoral votes in the Electoral College. Unlike all other states except Nebraska, Maine awards two electoral votes based on the statewide vote, and one vote for each congressional district.

On election day, Biden carried Maine at-large by nine percentage points and the 1st congressional district by 23 percentage points, garnering three electoral votes. However, the rural 2nd district backed Trump by more than seven percentage points, giving him one electoral vote. This was the same result as 2016, and as such marked only the second time since 1828 that Maine split its electoral votes.

Maine became the first state to use ranked-choice voting for a presidential general election, with voters able to rank their preferred candidates on the ballot.

Biden performed strongly with college-educated and high income voters to win Maine. Maine weighed in for this election as 5% more Democratic than the national average.

Primary elections
The primary elections were held on Super Tuesday, March 3, 2020.

Republican primary

Incumbent President Donald Trump ran unopposed in the Republican primary, and thus he received all of Maine's 22 delegates to the 2020 Republican National Convention.

Democratic primary
In an electoral upset, moderate candidate Joe Biden won the state, which primary opponent Bernie Sanders previously won in 2016.

Libertarian nominee
Jo Jorgensen, Psychology Senior Lecturer at Clemson University

Green nominee
Howie Hawkins, co-founder of the Green Party, trade unionist and environmental activist

Alliance nominee
Rocky De La Fuente, businessman

General election

Ballot access

Libertarian
The Libertarian Party was recognized by Maine as an official party in June 2016 but lost that status in December 2018. To qualify for ballot access, Jorgensen was required to submit 4,000 petition signatures to the state by August 3. Jorgensen sued the state for a reduction of the signature requirement, citing an increase in the difficulty of petitioning caused by the COVID-19 pandemic. Jorgensen was successful in appearing on the ballot.

Final predictions

Polling

Graphical summary (statewide)

Aggregate polls

Statewide polls

Maine's 1st congressional district

Graphical summary

Aggregate polls

with Donald Trump and Joe Biden

Maine's 2nd congressional district

Graphical summary

Aggregate polls

with Donald Trump and Joe Biden

with Donald Trump and Pete Buttigieg

with Donald Trump and Kamala Harris

with Donald Trump and Bernie Sanders

with Donald Trump and Elizabeth Warren

with Pete Buttigieg in Maine's 1st congressional district

with Kamala Harris in Maine's 1st congressional district

with Bernie Sanders in Maine's 1st congressional district

with Elizabeth Warren in Maine's 1st congressional district

with Pete Buttigieg in Maine's 2nd congressional district

with Kamala Harris in Maine's 2nd congressional district

with Bernie Sanders in Maine's 2nd congressional district

with Elizabeth Warren in Maine's 2nd congressional district

with Generic Democrat

with Generic Opponent

with Generic Democrat in Maine's 1st congressional district

with Generic Democrat in Maine's 2nd congressional district

Results

Statewide (2 electoral votes)

1st congressional district (1 electoral vote)

2nd congressional district (1 electoral vote)

By county

Counties that flipped from Republican to Democratic
Kennebec (largest municipality: Augusta)

By congressional district 
Joe Biden won the 1st district as the incumbent Democratic representative was re-elected. Donald Trump won the 2nd district despite the incumbent Democratic representative being re-elected.

Analysis 
Biden carried Maine by a 9.1% margin over Trump, improving over Hillary Clinton's 3% win margin in 2016. Biden handily carried Maine's 1st congressional district by 23%, while Trump carried its 2nd congressional district by 7.4%, winning a single electoral vote from the state. This marked the first election in history in which Maine and Nebraska both split their electoral votes. Ranked-choice tabulation was ultimately not used as Biden earned a majority statewide and in the 1st district, while Trump earned a majority in the 2nd district. Biden narrowly flipped Kennebec County (home to the state capital, Augusta) four years after Clinton lost it. All other counties favored the same party they did in 2016.

Maine is located in New England, an area that has become a Democratic Party stronghold. It was once a classic Rockefeller Republican state, but social issues have moved it to the Democratic column. The last Republican to win all its electoral votes was George H. W. Bush in 1988. Per exit polls by the Associated Press, Biden's strength in Maine came from liberals, with Biden winning whites 54%–44%, including 56% of white women. Biden was even competitive with Trump among Maine's gun owners, a traditionally Republican interest group, capturing 42% of their vote to Trump's 57%.

This was the first presidential election since 2004 in which Maine's 2nd congressional district backed the losing candidate, and the 2nd district is the only part of the so-called Blue Wall which Trump won in 2020, referring to states and electoral-vote areas that voted Democrat in every election from 1992 to 2012; Biden thus became the first Democrat since 1976 to win the White House without carrying this district. Biden also became the first Democrat since 1892 to win the White House without carrying Androscoggin County, the first since 1976 to do so without carrying Aroostook, Franklin, Oxford, Penobscot, or Washington counties, and the first since 1992 to do so without carrying Somerset County.

See also
 2020 Maine elections
 United States presidential elections in Maine
 2020 United States presidential election
 2020 Democratic Party presidential primaries
 2020 Republican Party presidential primaries
 2020 United States elections

Notes

Partisan clients

References

Further reading

External links
 Elections & Voting division of the Maine Secretary of State
 
 
  (State affiliate of the U.S. League of Women Voters)

Maine
2020
Presidential